The Mahoning Valley Thunder was a professional af2 arena football team from 2007 to 2009.

Having entered af2 as an expansion team in 2007, the Thunder played its home games at Cortland Banks Field at the Covelli Centre in downtown Youngstown, Ohio.

The team's colors were a combination of Black and Navy Blue, with the minor color of Gray.

Single-game tickets ranged from $5.00 to $50.00.

The team sold out their inaugural home game, on March 31, 2007, to a crowd of over 5,900 fans, while their 2nd home game entertained almost 4,800 fans, on April 21, 2007.

The Thunder's first head coach, Mike Hold, went 11-26 in his two-plus years at the helm. Hold was fired on April 28, 2009.

After going 0-3 under interim head coach, Brennan Booth, the Thunder named the franchise's second head coach, Chris MacKeown, on May 26, 2009. The team ended with a 2-14 record in 2009.

Attendance declined steadily over the three years, and the owners were unable to find investors to keep the team afloat. This led to an announcement on September 9, 2009 that the team will suspend operations indefinitely. It is assumed that the team will not return, as the af2 league disbanded the same day.

Season-by-season

|-
|2007 || 7 || 9 || 0 || 3rd AC East || --
|-
|2008 || 3 || 13 || 0 || 4th AC East || --
|-
|2009 || 2 || 14 || 0 || 4th AC East || 
|-
!Totals || 12 || 36 || 0
|colspan="2"|
|}

References

External links

 Official website
 ArenaFan

Defunct American football teams in Ohio
Sports in Youngstown, Ohio
Defunct af2 teams
American football teams established in 2007
American football teams disestablished in 2009
2007 establishments in Ohio
2009 disestablishments in Ohio